Romans in Persia is related to the brief invasion and occupation of western and central areas of Parthia (modern-day Iran) by the Romans during their empire. Emperor Trajan was even temporarily able to nominate a king of western parts of Parthia, Parthamaspates, as ruler of a Roman "client state" in Parthia.

Characteristics

The Romans, having expanded into the eastern Mediterranean, came in contact with their historical rivals in the Middle East: the Parthians and Persians, whose respective empires occupied modern Iran and surrounding areas. The Iranian empires that faced the Romans had different names, related to the origin of the dynasties in control of their empires in different historical periods: first were the Medians (Media Atropatene), then Parthians and finally Sassanians.

In 64 BC Pompey conquered the remaining Seleucid territories in Syria, extinguishing their state and advancing the Roman eastern frontier to the Euphrates, where Romans met for the first time the territory of the Parthians.

Mark Antony, in his quest to avenge the battle of Carrhae defeat, conquered in 33 BC some areas of Atropatene (northern Iran) and Armenia but soon lost it: that was the first time that Romans occupied a Persian territory, even if temporarily.

Furthermore, probably in 20 BC, Augustus is said to have nominated Ariobarzanes II, the son of Artavasdes, to be king of Media Atropatene, creating a semi-authonomous "vassal state" of Rome in what is now northwestern Iran. But soon, around 19 AD, The Parthians took again full control of Atropatene.

Although warfare between the Romans and the Parthians/Sassanids lasted for seven centuries, the frontier remained largely stable in those centuries. A game of tug of war ensued: towns, fortifications, and provinces were continuously sacked, captured, destroyed, and traded. The line of stalemate shifted in the 2nd century AD with Trajan: it had run along the northern Euphrates until then. The new line ran northeast, across Mesopotamia to the northern Tigris. There were also several substantial shifts further north, in Armenia and the Caucasus.

A new series of wars began in the 2nd century AD, during which the Romans consistently held the upper hand over Parthia. In 113 AD the Roman Emperor Trajan decided that the moment was ripe to resolve the "eastern question" once and for all time by the decisive defeat of Parthia and the annexation of Armenia: his conquests mark a deliberate change of the Roman Policy towards Parthia, and a shift of emphasis in the "grand strategy" of the empire.

Finally, one characteristic of the Roman presence in Persia is that Roman emperors dreamed of conquering all Persia from Trajan to Galerius, while Parthian/Sassanian kings never tried to conquer Rome, Italy or southeastern Europe according to historian Theodor Mommsen.

Roman Parthia

Romans were able to conquer the westernmost part of Parthia under emperor Trajan.

Indeed, in 113 AD Trajan invaded Parthia, marching first on Armenia. In 114 AD Trajan annexed Armenia to the Roman empire, after defeating and killing Parthamasiris, relative of Osroes I of Parthia. Then he turned south into Parthia itself, taking the cities of Babylon, Seleucia and finally the capital of Ctesiphon in 116 AD.

He deposed Osroes I and put his own puppet ruler Parthamaspates on the throne. In Mesopotamia Osroes' brother Mithridates IV and his son Sanatruces II took the diadem and fought against the Romans, but Trajan marched southward to the Persian Gulf, defeated them, and declared Mesopotamia a new province of the empire. In the process, he also captured the great city of Susa in Khuzestan.

Those months of 116 and 117 saw western Parthia as a client state of the Romans. Trajan originally planned to annex Parthia as part of the Roman Empire, but ultimately decided instead to place Parthamaspates on his father's throne as a Roman client, doing so in 116.

Trajan created even the province of Assyria, whose eastern border were never well defined by historians: it is possible that included northwestern Elam, a semi-autonomous Persian province (now Īlām Province of Iran) that welcomed his conquest of Mesopotamia.

Following the death of Trajan and Roman withdrawal from the area, Osroes easily defeated Parthamaspates and reclaimed the Persian throne. Hadrian acknowledged this fait accompli, recognized Osroes, Parthamaspates king of Osroene, and returned Osroes' daughter who had been taken prisoner by Trajan (as a warranty to control his client state).

Even if there were further attacks from Roman emperors against the Parthian and later Sassanid empire (Romans even suffered humiliating defeats, like with emperor Valerian), no huge territory of actual Iran was never occupied again by Roman legions: The Romans stopped always after conquering Ctesiphon and soon returned behind their "limes siriacus" (only in 298 AD western Atropene up to lake Urmia was occupied by Romans for half a century).

Indeed, this city (capital of the Parthian and Sassanian empire, but not located in Iran) was captured by Rome five times in its history - three times in the 2nd century alone. The emperor Trajan captured Ctesiphon in 116 AD, but his successor, Hadrian, decided to willingly return Ctesiphon the next year as part of a peace settlement. The Roman general Avidius Cassius captured Ctesiphon in 164 AD during another Parthian war, but abandoned it when peace was concluded. In 197 AD, the emperor Septimius Severus sacked Ctesiphon and carried off thousands of its inhabitants, whom he sold into slavery. Late in the 3rd century, after the Parthians had been supplanted by the Sassanids, the city again became a source of conflict with Rome. In 283 AD, emperor Carus sacked the city uncontested during a period of civil upheaval. In 295 AD, emperor Diocletianus sent Galerius but was defeated outside the city. However, he returned a year later with a vengeance and won a victory which ended in the fifth and final capture of the city by the Romans in 299 AD.

Furthermore, in 297 AD Galerius marched into eastern Armenia and crushed there a Persian force, capturing an enormous amount of booty and even the harem and family of the Sassanian King Narseh. Moving later into Mesopotamia, Galerius' advance had the Persian defence collapsing before him and so he conquered the Persian capital Ctesiphon. Badly mauled, the Persians sued for peace. In AD 298 the province of Mesopotamia, together with even some territory from across the river Tigris up to the lacus Matianus (now called Lake Urmia in western Iran), was restored to Rome for half a century with an important Treaty.

According to this Treaty:

Five provinces beyond the Tigris were to be ceded to the Romans. One writer gives these provinces as Intilene, Sophene, Arzanene, Carduene, and Zabdicene; while another as Arzanene, Moxoene, Zabdicene, Rehimene, and Corduene.
The Roman vassal "Kingdom of Armenia" was to be extended up to the fortress of Zintha, in Media Atropatene.

Galerius (who occupied western Persia up to lake Matianus) wanted to conquest all Persia after his victory against Sassanian king Narseh, but Diocletianus preferred to have a Treaty and did the last "Parade" in Rome with a significant victory in the history of the Roman Empire.

Romans withdrew from the homeland territory of Persia with the 363 AD defeat of Jovian, and only Byzantine emperor Heraclius was able to return and conquer Gazaca (the capital of Atropatene) during the Byzantine–Sasanian War of 602–628, just a few years before the Arab conquest of Sassanian Persia.

Valerian Bridge

There are few Roman ruins in Persia, but one seems to be related to curious war events: the Valerian Bridge.
 
This Valerian Bridge (Band-e Kaisar in Persian, literally "bridge of Caesar") is named after the Roman emperor Valerian (253–260 AD) who was captured with many legionaries by the Sassanid ruler Shapur I after having been defeated in the Battle of Edessa (260). This vast labour force, which may have numbered up to 50,000 men and included the Roman engineering corps, was deported and was probably employed by the victors for construction work in Shushtar, an important agricultural center in south-western Iran. To service its large stretches of arable land, altogether some 150,000 hectares, the Romans set out to construct three structures: a canal called Ab-i Gargar, and the two dams of Band-e Kaisar and Band-e Mizan which directed the water flow of the Karun river into the artificial watercourse. Perhaps the bridge was built by soldiers of the Sixth legion Ferrata, because this unit disappears from sources after Valerian's defeat.

The story of the Valerian Bridge was written by the Muslim historians Tabari and Masudi in the 9th and 10th centuries. Although their novel-like narrative cannot be ignored, the historical presence of the Romans is corroborated by modern local names, such as "Roumischgan" for a nearby village, and a Lurs tribe by the name of "Rumian". Moreover, local tradition ascribes to Roman settlers the origin of a number of trades, like the local production of brocade, and several popular customs.

The bridge has been designated by UNESCO as Iran's 10th World Heritage Site in 2009.

See also

 Roman Armenia
 Roman Mesopotamia
 Roman Assyria
 Roman Azerbaijan
 Roman Georgia
 Trajan
 Galerius
 Heraclius
 Media Atropatene
 Roman relations with the Parthians and Sasanians
 Parthia
 Sassanid Empire
 Roman Empire
 Arrajan
 Weh Antiok Khosrow
 Gundishapur

Notes

Bibliography

 Angeli Bertinelli, Maria. Roma e l'Oriente: strategia, economia, società e cultura nelle relazioni politiche fra Roma, la Giudea e l'Iran. L'Erma di Bretschneider editore. Roma, 1979
 Arborio Mella, Federico. L'impero persiano. Da Ciro il grande alla conquista araba. Mursia editore. Milano, 1980
 Dignas, Beate and Winter, Engelbert. Rome and Persia in Late Antiquity: Neighbours and Rivals. Cambridge University Press. Cambridge, 2004 
 Lepper, F.A. Trajan's Parthian War. London: Oxford University Press, 1948.
 Luttvak, Edward N. The Grand Strategy of the Roman Empire: From the First Century A.D. to the Third, Baltimore: Johns Hopkins University Press, 1979, 

Roman–Parthian Wars
Provinces of the Roman Empire
Roman–Sasanian Wars